George A. Balanis (born March 7, 1942) is an American former head basketball coach for the William & Mary Tribe men's team from 1974 to 1977. In three years as coach he compiled a 21–12 record in Southern Conference play (47-39 overall).

References

1942 births
Living people
Basketball coaches from Virginia
Sportspeople from Newport News, Virginia
Sportspeople from Williamsburg, Virginia
University of Texas at El Paso alumni
William & Mary Tribe men's basketball coaches